Darren Douglas Weber (born February 5, 1972) was a Zimbabwean cricketer. He was a right-handed batsman and a right-arm off-break bowler who played for Matabeleland. He was born in Bulawayo.

Weber made two first-class appearances for the team, during the Logan Cup competition of 1994-95. Batting in the tailend, he was mostly ineffective, making a top score of just 5 in four innings.

External links
Darren Weber at Cricket Archive 

1972 births
Living people
Zimbabwean cricketers
Matabeleland cricketers